A partial lunar eclipse took place on Sunday, April 13, 1930.

Visibility

Related lunar eclipses

Saros series 

Lunar Saros 111, repeating every 18 years and 11 days, has a total of 71 lunar eclipse events including 11 total lunar eclipses. The first total lunar eclipse of this series was on April 19, 1353, and last was on August 4, 1533. The longest occurrence of this series was on June 12, 1443 when the totality lasted 106 minutes.

See also
List of lunar eclipses
List of 20th-century lunar eclipses

Notes

External links

1930-04
1930 in science